The 23rd Annual Australian Recording Industry Association Music Awards (generally known as ARIA Music Awards or simply The ARIAs) took place on 26 November 2009 at the Acer Arena at the Sydney Olympic Park complex. The ceremony was telecast on the Nine Network at 8:30pm that night. The nominees for all categories were announced on 8 October, with the winners of the Fine Arts Awards and Artisan Awards announced on 10 November. Biggest winners for the year were Empire of the Sun which collected a total of seven awards.

The ARIA Hall of Fame inducted: Kev Carmody, The Dingoes, Little Pattie, Mental As Anything and John Paul Young.

Ceremony details
The ceremony was hosted by Gyton Grantley and Kate Ritchie with presenters including Ruby Rose, Missy Higgins, Powderfinger, Orianthi, Vanessa Amorosi, Guy Sebastian, Natalie Bassingthwaighte, Richard Wilkins, Lee Kernaghan, Daniel Merriweather, Jabba, Jason Dundas, Natalie Gruzlewski, John Butler, Keith Urban, Tim Ross (Rosso), Cassie Davis, Andrew G, Jimmy Barnes, Marieke Hardy, Lindsay McDougall, Rove McManus and Robbie Williams.

Performers were The Temper Trap, Keith Urban, Jessica Mauboy, Hilltop Hoods, Empire of the Sun, Sarah Blasko, Lisa Mitchell, Kate Miller-Heidke, Sydney Children's Choir, Ladyhawke and Robbie Williams, who performed his new single "Bodies".

Multiple winners and nominees

Empire of the Sun – 7 awards from 11 nominations
Hilltop Hoods – 2 awards from 6 nominations
Ladyhawke – 2 awards from 6 nominations
AC/DC – 2 awards from 4 nominations
Jessica Mauboy – 1 award from 7 nominations
Sarah Blasko – 1 award from 5 nominations
C. W. Stoneking – 1 award from 4 nominations
Eskimo Joe – 5 nominations
Kate Miller-Heidke – 4 nominations
The Temper Trap – 4 nominations
Lisa Mitchell – 3 nominations

Awards
Nominees and winners with results indicated on the right.

ARIA Hall of Fame Inductees
The following were inducted into the 2009 ARIA Hall of Fame on 27 August at Melbourne's Forum Theatre:
 Kev Carmody
 The Dingoes
 Little Pattie
 Mental As Anything
 John Paul Young

Judging academy

In 2009, the generalist categories were determined by the "voting academy", which consisted of about 1000 representatives from across the music industry. (See pie chart at right for percentage breakdowns.)

Members of the academy are kept secret. Membership is by invitation only. An individual record company may have up to eight members on the academy. The only artists eligible to vote are winners and nominees from the previous year's awards.

Notes

See also
Music of Australia

References

External links
ARIA Awards official website
2009:23rd Annual ARIA Awards

2009 in Australian music
2009 music awards
ARIA Music Awards